Maurice Pelé (8 December 1928 – 20 February 2021) was a French cyclist.

Biography
Throughout his career, Pelé was a member of the teams Vélo Sport Mésanger and Pédale Nantaise. In 1953, he won the Grand Prix de l'Équipe et du CV 19e, the former version of the Paris–Tours Espoirs. His professional career lasted from 1954 to 1962. His son, Maurice Pelé Jr., was also a cyclist.

Maurice Pelé died in Nantes on 20 February 2021 at the age of 92.

References

1928 births
2021 deaths
French male cyclists
Cyclists from Loire-Atlantique